The following is a comprehensive discography of Napalm Death, an influential English grindcore/death metal band.

Albums

Studio albums

Live albums

Compilation albums

Video albums

Cover albums

EPs

Singles

Music videos

Compilation appearances
 Chapter 3 – Various Artists (by Jako of "The Joy of Propaganda", 2 songs, 1982)
 Ruptured Gut – Various Artists (by Twisted Tapes, 2 songs, 1982)
 Twisted Nervous Breakdown – Various Artists (by Twisted Tapes, 1 song, 1982)
 Subversive Elements – Various Artists (2 songs, 1982)
 Bullshit Detector #3 : "Crucifixion of Possessions" (1984)
 North Atlantic Noise Attack : "Scum", "Life?", "Retreat To Nowhere" (different from LP versions; same recording session as "Internal Animosity" from Pathological Compilation) 1989
 Hardcore Holocaust : "Moral Crusade",  "M.A.D.", "Divine Death", "Control"  1989
 Grind Crusher : "The Missing Link" 1989
 Grind Crusher – free 7-inch : "You Suffer" 1989
 Hardcore Holocaust II Peel Sessions : "Walls/Raging in Hell/Conform or Die/S.O.B." 1990
 Pathological Compilation : "Internal Animosity" – unreleased song 1990
 Grind Crusher – The Ultimate Earache : "The World Keeps Turning" 1992
 Masters of Brutality I : "Suffer the Children" 1992
 Masters of Brutality II : "The World Keeps Turning" 1992
 Virus 100 : "Nazi Punks Fuck Off" – unreleased song 1992
 Earplugged I : "Plague Rages" and "State of Mind" 1994
 Earplugged I (Japanese release): "I Abstain" 1994
 Rareache : "Living in Denial" and "Internal Animosity" – unreleased songs 1995
 Better Read Than Dead: ?? (1996)
 Mortal Kombat (soundtrack motion picture) : "Twist the Knife (Slowly)" 1996
 Metallurgy I : "Greed Killing" demo version – unreleased song 1996
 Earplugged II : "Breed to Breathe" 1997
 Earplugged III: "The Infiltraitor" 1998
 Hellspawn : "Breed to Breathe" remixed by DELTA 9 – unreleased song 1998
 Anti Racist Action : "Unchallenged Hate" live – unreleased song (only in America) 1998
 Hard Music News Vol 2: "The Icing on the Hate" 2002
 What Lies Beneath: "Silence Is Deafening" 2005
 Earache Summer Sampler 2007: "Scum (Remastered)" 2007
 Grind Madness at the BBC : 34 Songs from Peel Sessions, 2009

Demos
 "Hatred Surge" (1985)
 "From Enslavement to Obliteration (Demo)" (1986)
 "Scum (Demo)" (1986)

All demos are self-produced.

References

Vinylnet Record Label Discographies. link. – Earache catalogue numbers where applicable.

Heavy metal group discographies
Discographies of British artists